Hanumant Rudrappa Nirani is an Indian politician who is a Member of Karnataka Legislative Council from North West Graduates constituency since 5 July 2016. He is the brother of Murugesh Nirani current Minister of Industries, Government of Karnataka.

References 

Living people
1967 births
Indian politicians
Bharatiya Janata Party politicians from Karnataka